Zemio is a town and sub-prefecture in the Haut-Mbomou prefecture of the south-eastern Central African Republic. Zemio was the former capital of the Sultanate of Zemio before it was abolished in 1923 by France.

History 
French Congo colonial government sent five prisoners from Annam to Zemio to work for the French garrison in 1896. The workers planted rice, banana, and tobacco and established a settlement near the town. The prisoners stayed in Zemio until 10 April 1904, when they had to move to Brazzaville. In 1924, a missionary named John Buyse established AIM mission station in Zemio.

In the 1970s, Zemio was the center of the illegal ivory trade.

On 28 June 2017 Ugandan forces withdrew from Zemio. Armed Muslims entered town killing at least 28 civilians. As of January 2021 Zemio remains under control of Union for Peace in the Central African Republic rebel groups.

Transport
The town is served by Zemio Airport.

References 

Sub-prefectures of the Central African Republic
Populated places in Haut-Mbomou